Zhang Peng may refer to:

 Zhang Peng (artist) (born 1981), Chinese artist
 Zhang Peng (sailor) (born 1981), Chinese sailor
 Zhang Peng (cyclist), Chinese cross-country mountain biker
 Zhang Peng (table tennis)